Faith Susan Alberta Watson (March 6, 1955 – March 21, 2015), better known as Alberta Watson, was a Canadian film and television actress.

Early life
Watson was born in Toronto, Ontario, in 1955. She grew up in Toronto with her mother Grace, a factory worker, and her brother. She began performing with a local Toronto theatre group, T.H.O.G. (Theatre House of God), of the Bathurst Street United Church, at age 15.

Watson took a workshop for the Hair musical. While at the workshop she acted in Hamlet, which was directed by René Bonnière, who later directed her in La Femme Nikita.

Acting career
Watson got her first role at age 19 in a CBC movie called Honor Thy Father. Early in her career she portrayed the role of Mitzi in George Kaczender's In Praise of Older Women (1978), for which she received a Genie nomination. A year later she received the Best Actress award at the Yorkton Film Festival for "Exposure". She moved to Los Angeles, California, and later to New York City.

Watson lived in New Jersey for eight years with her husband until they divorced. She then returned to Toronto and focused on finding roles in independent films. She worked with director Colleen Murphy on the film Shoemaker (1996), for which she received a second Genie nomination for Best Actress.

Among her well-known film roles are the bed-ridden mother Susan Aibelli in the 1994 American independent film Spanking the Monkey, Lauren Murphy (the mother of Jonny Lee Miller's character Dade, also called "Crash Override"/"Zero Cool") in the 1995 cult film Hackers, and Risa in the 1997 Academy Award-nominated Canadian film The Sweet Hereafter, directed by Atom Egoyan.

In Spanking the Monkey, Watson plays her favourite character, a mother who has an incestuous relationship with her son. The role was turned down by several actresses such as Susan Sarandon, Jessica Lange and others. Watson said:

She played the role of Madeline in La Femme Nikita for four seasons from 1997 to 2001 (with guest appearances in the short fifth season). During the show's second season (in 1998), Watson was diagnosed with lymphoma, for which she had to undergo chemotherapy treatment which caused her to lose her hair. Producers at La Femme Nikita worked around her treatment and limited her appearances. Watson wore wigs in the show when she lost her hair. When her hair started to regrow, she sported the short haircut in her role as Madeline in the show's third season.

Watson's first name inspired the character Alberta Green in the first season of 24. In 2005, Watson joined the cast of 24, playing CTU Director Erin Driscoll for 12 episodes of the show's fourth season.

During 2007 and 2008, Watson played a supporting role in the Canadian television series The Border as the Minister of Public Safety.

In 2010, Watson guest-starred in Heartland, a series on CBC Television, and she won a 2011 Gemini Award for her portrayal of Sarah Craven.

In a nod to her La Femme Nikita role, Alberta played a recurring character Madeline Pierce in Nikita, the CW's 2010–2013 reboot of the film and TV series.

Death
Watson died on March 21, 2015, due to complications from cancer at Kensington Hospice in Toronto fifteen days after her 60th birthday.

Filmography

Film

Television

Bibliography
 Heyn, Christopher. "A Conversation with Alberta Watson". Inside Section One: Creating and Producing TV's La Femme Nikita. Introduction by Peta Wilson. Los Angeles: Persistence of Vision Press, 2006. pp. 88–93. . In-depth conversation with Alberta Watson about her role as Madeline on La Femme Nikita, as well as her more recent acting experiences.

References

External links

An Alberta Watson interview
Alberta's fan site(Wayback version)

Alberta Watson; Aveleyman

1955 births
2015 deaths
20th-century Canadian actresses
21st-century Canadian actresses
Actresses from Toronto
Canadian film actresses
Canadian television actresses
Deaths from cancer in Ontario
Canadian Screen Award winners